The Budapesti Honvéd SE Athletics section was created in 1950 and is one of the most successful athletics teams in Hungary.

Achievements

Notable athletes

  Zoltán Adamik
  Tibor Bédi
  Zoltán Cziffra
  Zétény Dombi
  Géza Fejér
  Rita Ináncsi
  Henrik Kalocsai
  Annamária Kovács
  Zoltán Kővágó
  István Major
  Magda Paulányi
  Antal Róka
  István Rózsavölgyi
  Tünde Vaszi
  Györgyi Zsivoczky-Farkas

References

External links
Club website 
Official Budapesti Honvéd SE website  

Athletics clubs in Hungary
Sports clubs established in 1950